South of Reno is a 1988 American drama film directed by Mark Rezyka and starring Jeff Osterhage, Lisa Blount, Lewis Van Bergen, Joe Estevez, Julia Montgomery, Brandis Kemp, Danitza Kingsley and Bert Remsen.  It is Rezyka's directorial debut.

Cast
Jeff Osterhage as Martin Clark
Lisa Blount as Anette Clark
Joe Estevez as Hector
Lewis Van Bergen as Willard
Julia Montgomery as Susan
Danitza Kingsley as Louise
Brandis Kemp as Brenda
Bert Remsen as Howard Stone
Mary Grace Canfield as Motel Manager
Billy Bob Thornton as Counterman
Jason Ronard as Trucker #1
Duane Tucker as Trucker #2

Reception
Leonard Maltin awarded the film two and a half stars.

References

External links
 
 

American drama films
1988 directorial debut films
1988 films
Films directed by Mark Rezyka
1980s English-language films
1980s American films